is a Japanese football player. She plays for Gyeongju KHNP. She played for Japan national team.

Club career
Tanaka was born in Sakai on 23 April 1988. After graduating from high school, she joined Tasaki Perule FC in 2007. However, the club was disbanded in 2008 due to financial strain. She moved to INAC Kobe Leonessa in 2009. She was selected Best Eleven in 2011 and 2012. She moved to German Bundesliga club Frankfurt in July 2013. In October 2014, she returned to INAC Kobe Leonessa. She moved to Korean WK League club Gyeongju KHNP.

National team career

In November 2008, Tanaka was selected by the Japan U-20 national team for the 2008 U-20 World Cup. In March 2011, Tanaka was selected by the Japan national team for the 2011 Algarve Cup. At this competition, on 4 March, she debuted against Finland. In July, she played at the 2011 World Cup as Japan won the championship. She also played at the 2012 Summer Olympics and the 2015 World Cup. Japan won 2nd place at both tournaments. She played 39 games and scored 3 goals for Japan until 2016.

Club statistics

*Champions League

National team statistics

National team Goals

Honors

International
 Japan National Team
 AFC U-17 Women's Championship
 Champion: 2005
 FIFA Women's World Cup
 Champion: 2011

Club
 INAC Kobe Leonessa
 L.League
 Champions: 2011, 2012
 Empress's Cup
 Champions: 2010, 2011, 2012
 Japan and South Korea Women's League Championship
 Champion: 2012

 Frankfurt
 DFB-Pokal
 Champion: 2013–14

Individual
 L.League Division 1
 Best Eleven: 2011, 2012

References

External links

Japan Football Association

1988 births
Living people
Association football people from Osaka Prefecture
People from Sakai, Osaka
Japanese women's footballers
Japan women's international footballers
Nadeshiko League players
Tasaki Perule FC players
INAC Kobe Leonessa players
1. FFC Frankfurt players
Japanese expatriate footballers
Expatriate women's footballers in Germany
Japanese expatriate sportspeople in Germany
FIFA Women's World Cup-winning players
2011 FIFA Women's World Cup players
2015 FIFA Women's World Cup players
Olympic footballers of Japan
Olympic silver medalists for Japan
Olympic medalists in football
Medalists at the 2012 Summer Olympics
Footballers at the 2012 Summer Olympics
Women's association football midfielders